Charles Forrest Curry (March 14, 1858 – October 10, 1930) was a U.S. Representative from California and the father of Charles Forrest Curry, Jr.

Curry was born in Naperville, Illinois and attended the common schools and the Episcopal Academy in Mineral Point, Wisconsin. He studied one year at the University of Washington in Seattle and was also educated by a private tutor. In 1872, he moved with his parents to Seattle, Washington and then to San Francisco the following year.

There, Curry engaged in agricultural pursuits and the cattle, lumber and mining businesses. He served as a member of the State Assembly in 1887 and 1888. He became admitted to the bar of San Francisco in 1888 and was then the superintendent of Station B post office, San Francisco, from 1890 to 1894. After that Curry served as clerk of San Francisco city and county between 1894 and 1898. He was the Secretary of State of California from 1899 to 1910. He was an unsuccessful candidate for the Republican nomination for governor in 1910. The following year, he was appointed Building and Loan Commissioner of California. In the same year, he served as the representative to the Panama–Pacific International Exposition for the Pacific Coast and Intermountain States.

Curry was elected as a Republican to the Sixty-third Congress. He served eight consecutive terms from March 4, 1913 until his death in Washington, D.C., October 10, 1930 at which point his son won his seat as a write-in candidate. During  his tenure as a Congressman, he served as chairman of the Committee on Territories (Sixty-sixth through Seventy-first Congresses).

In 1921, Curry had a new elementary school named in his honor in Vallejo, California. Charles F. Curry school was located at 321 Wallace Avenue, and was in operation from 1921 until 1973. The grounds also housed Carol Vista, a school for handicapped and special needs students.

After his death, Curry was interred in Abbey Mausoleum (near Arlington National Cemetery), Arlington, Virginia. He was reinterred in National Memorial Park, Falls Church, Virginia.

See also 
 List of United States Congress members who died in office (1900–49)

References 

 Political Graveyard website

1858 births
1930 deaths
People from Naperville, Illinois
American people of Cornish descent
Republican Party members of the United States House of Representatives from California
Secretaries of State of California
Republican Party members of the California State Assembly